Carolyn Conwell (May 16, 1930 – October 22, 2012) was an American actress.

Conwell studied under Herbert Berghof in New York and Jeff Corey in Los Angeles. She appeared in many theatre productions, including Hamlet and A Streetcar Named Desire. Conwell had three children and resided in Los Angeles. She was best known for playing Mary Williams on The Young and the Restless (1980–2004).

Filmography
Torn Curtain (1966) – Farmer's Wife
The Big Valley (1967–1968, TV Series) – Mrs. Wiggins / Idanell Bowles
The Boston Strangler (1968) – Irmgard DeSalvo
Medical Center (1969, TV Series) – Doris Webb
Nanny and the Professor (1970, TV Series) – Mrs. Parsons
Adam at 6 A.M. (1970) – Mavis
The Magnificent Seven Ride! (1972) – Martha
The Quest (1976, TV Series) – Luana
Lou Grant (1978, TV Series) – Mrs. Pratt
Little House on the Prairie (1979, TV Series) – Bess Slade
General Hospital (1980, TV Series)
Knots Landing (1980, TV Series) – Hooker
Cheech & Chong's Next Movie (1980) – Swedish Maid
The Young and the Restless (1980–2004, TV Series) – Mary Williams (final appearance)

References

External links
 
 

1930 births
2012 deaths
Actresses from Chicago
American stage actresses
American television actresses
Place of death missing
21st-century American women